Ram Navami is a Hindu festival celebrating the birthday of Hindu deity Rama. It falls on the 9th day of the Chaitra month every year in the Hindu calendar, usually during the months of March–April. At least since 1979, if not earlier, This festival often involves processions of Hindu worshipers through cities, including Muslim-majority regions. These displays, often considered provocative, have repeatedly led to violence between Hindu and Muslim communities. Scholar Paul Brass states that Rama himself has been turned into a political emblem of the RSS family of organisations, and the Ram Navami processions are "led by or turned into provocative displays" by militant Hindutva organisations such as the Vishva Hindu Parishad (VHP) and Bajrang Dal.

Background 

Rama is regarded as the seventh avatar of Vishnu, who was born as the prince of Ayodhya and lived a model life upholding the Hindu principles of dharma despite all his travails. Rama's birthday (Ram Navami) which falls on the 9th day of the Hindu new year (generally in March–April) is celebrated by Hindus all over the world. The day is marked with puja (devotional worship) such as bhajan and kirtan, by fasting and reading passages about Rama's life. Special locations mentioned in the Ramayana legends observe major celebrations. These include Ayodhya (Uttar Pradesh), Rameswaram (Tamil Nadu), Bhadrachalam (Telangana) and Sitamarhi (Bihar). Some locations organise Ratha Yatras (chariot processions).

Rama is central to the political imagination of the Hindu nationalist organisation Rashtriya Swayamsevak Sangh (RSS), the parent organisation of the ruling Bharatiya Janata Party (BJP). RSS was launched on the Vijayadashami day of 1925, a day commemorating Rama's victory over Ravana, and it was given its name "Rashtriya Swayamsevak Sangh" on the Ram Navami day of 1926. Its first public mission was in assisting the organisation of the Ram Navami festival at Ramtek, an occasion selected by its founder Hedgewar with "great care". RSS also chose for itself a flag, which in its saffron colour and shape, is deemed to have been Rama's flag, and believed to have been used by Shivaji.

However, for several decades of its existence, religion was not a major part of the RSS efforts of mobilisation, but rather a 'nationalist' campaign, identifying the 'nation' with Hindus. (The religious space was at that time occupied by Hindu Mahasabha, a political party with which RSS was vaguely allied.) This changed in 1964, when the RSS founded Vishva Hindu Parishad (VHP), an affiliate organisation that would campaign for Hindus as well as the Hindu religion.

According to The Hitavada, a grand procession called Shobha Yatra was started on the occasion of Ram Navami in Nagpur, the home of the RSS, around 1967. In contrast to traditional rath-yatras, which are organised by temples and are generally limited to nearby areas, the shobha yatras are grand processions of pomp and ceremony attempting to cover entire cities, involving "cavalcades of vehicles, each carrying dozens of men, shouting slogans and frequently wielding arms". In 1987, in the midst of the Babri Masjid–Ram Janmabhoomi dispute, the Vishva Hindu Parishad is said to have organised country-wide shobha yatras, including in Delhi, where arms were displayed and provocative slogans were raised.

1979 Jamshedpur riot 
The 1979 Jamshedpur riot was the first major riot on the occasion of Ram Navami, in which 108 people were declared to have died, among whom 79 Muslims and 25 Hindus were identified. The government-appointed commission of enquiry, the Jitendra Narain Commission, found the RSS and the RSS-affiliated local legislator, Dinanath Pandey, responsible for having created the climate conducive to the riot.

Jamshedpur was then a town in the state of Bihar (now a metropolis in the state of Jharkhand), named after the industrialist Jamshedji Tata, who established India's first steel plant at the location. The entire region was originally populated by tribes, referred to as adivasis. People from various parts of India came to work in the steel plant and settled in the town. The government in power at that time was that of a loose-knit coalition called Janata Party, of which the present day Bharatiya Janata Party was a constitent.

In an attempt to Hinduise the adivasi population, the RSS planned the Ram Navami procession of 1978 to start from an adivasi neighbourhood called Dimnabasti. However, the neighbouring locality was a Muslim area called Sabirnagar and the authorities refused permission for the procession to pass through it. The RSS campaigned on the issue for a whole year, arguing that the Hindus "in their own country" were not being allowed to freely carry out processions. The administration suggested an alternative route for 1979 that would avoid Sabirnagar, but the RSS did not relent.

Tensions increased in Jamshedpur as a result of the stand-off. Hindus forced the closure of shops and a few of them were arrested. In March 1979, the RSS chief Balasaheb Deoras visited Jamshedpur and gave a polarising speech, which further exacerbated the situation. An organisation called Sri Ramnavmi Kendriya Akhara Samiti issued a pamphlet on 7 April which declared communal violence and also detailed how it would occur. Eventually, a deal was reached and a sample procession passed through the Muslim locality, accompanied by local Muslims. But the main procession, which grew to 15,000 people, stopped in front of a masjid. The local MLA Dinanath Pandey announced that it would not move until all the arrested Hindus are released.

Eventually a stone was thrown at the procession from the side of the Muslims, who were also prepared for the violence. That provided the spark for the riots, which lasted several days. Thousands of houses were looted. Muslims living in Hindu areas were especially vulnerable. The police also proved to be partisan, targeting the Muslims more than the Hindus and also helping the Hindus in rioting. The government of Karpuri Thakur, a socialist within the Janata Party, fell roughly ten days after the events.

1984–1993 
In the early 1980s, the RSS pushed the Vishva Hindu Parishad to the forefront in an effort to create a 'Hindu vote'. The VHP held a series of conferences (Dharma Sansads), calling for the liberation of the Ram Janmabhoomi (Rama's birthplace), which was at that time occupied by the Babri Masjid. From then till 1992, when the Babri Masjid was demolished, the mobilisation of Hindus along religious lines was the main occupation of the VHP. Ram Navami as well as all other Hindu festivals were utilised for the purpose.

In 1986, the Ram Navami was on 16 April, a procession was taken out by Hindus, which was protested by the Muslims and therefore there was confrontation between the two communities.

In 1987, Ram Navami Shobha Yatras were organised around the country. The Shobha Yatra in Delhi, which closely followed a rally organised by the Muslims in defence of the Babri Masjid, raised provocative slogans and brandished arms.

The 1991 Bhadrak Communal violence was a communal incident which took place on day of Ram Navami in Bhadrak of Odisha on 20 March 1991. The riot happened during the Ram Navami procession while the procession was passing through the Muslim dominated area of Bhadrak town.

According to police records, 17 persons were murdered, 90 injured, 226 houses burnt and 143 shops were looted in Bhatkal, Karnataka. The riots were sparked off on April Fools' Day, when a stone was reportedly hurled at a Ram Navami procession.

2006 Aligarh riot 
On 5 April 2006, violence broke out between Hindus and Muslim during the Ram Navami celebration which led to the death of five people.

2009 Pusad riot 
Ram Navami procession in Pusad, Maharashtra was disrupted and stones were pelted which led to a violent riot. Over 70 shops were burnt and property was damaged in the riots.

2014 Kanpur riot 
When police and administration denied the permission for Ram Navami procession, violence broke out injuring many.

2016 Hazaribagh violence 
Curfew was promulgated in Hazaribagh town of Rajasthan and in surrounding areas after two groups of people clashed, torched shops and pelted stones at policemen injuring several of them on the last day of the Ram Navami festival.

2018 West Bengal riots 
Ram Navami procession that were scheduled to take place in Raniganj were disrupted when people from the other community objected the use of loud speakers. Soon the heated debate turned violent, and police personnel were attacked by bricks and stones. Bombing with crude bombs started as soon as mob became violent. Arindam Dutta Chowdhry Deputy Commissioner of Police (Headquarter), who reached the spot to monitor the situation, got injured in the bomb attack with his right hand almost blown away in the blast.

2019 riots

Asansol 
A Ram Navami rally taken out from Barakar Marwari Vidyalay, with most rallyist on the bikes, was pelted with stones when they attempted to pass through the Barakar Bazar. When they retaliated, the face-off turned violent.

Jodhpur 
A communal clash broke out on Saturday when a section of Muslims threw stones on a Ram Navami procession. Some vehicles were set on fire and mobs stoned houses and clashed with police injuring two cops in Vyapariyon ka Mohalla in Soorsagar police station.

2022 riots 
On the occasion of Rama Navami on 10 April 2022, India witnessed violence across multiple states.

Gujarat 
Violent clashes were reported which led to death of a person during the Ram Navami procession in Gujarat. Several shops were burnt and vehicles were damaged. Police had to fire tear gas shell to bring situation under control amid stone pelting.

Jharkhand 
Clashes were reported at least from 2 places in Jharkhand -  Bokaro and Lohardaga — on Ram Navami. In Bokaro, a few youths were attacked on their way to a Ram Navami procession.  In Lohardaga, the violence was on a larger scale with the rioters having set afire several vehicles. Many people were injured in stone-pelting.

Madhya Pradesh 
Madhya Pradesh's Khargone saw huge violence during the Ram Navami procession. To maintain law and order, police had to fire tear gas shells and curfew was imposed.

West Bengal 
Ram Navami procession was attacked and disrupted in West Bengal. Opposition party BJP alleged that the police attacked the religious procession.

Goa 
Clashes were reported when stones were pelted on Ram Navami procession.

Maharashtra 
Maharashtra's Amravati saw violent clashed between Hindus and Muslim which led to stone pelting. To maintain law and order, police imposed curfew under section 144.

Notes

References

Bibliography 
 
  
 
 
 
 
 
 

Anti-Muslim violence in India
Sangh Parivar